Christelle Le Duff (born 21 November 1982) is a French female rugby union player. She represented  at the 2006 Women's Rugby World Cup, and 2014 Women's Rugby World Cup. She was a member of France's 2013 Rugby World Cup Sevens squad.

References

1982 births
Living people
French female rugby union players
Female rugby sevens players
Place of birth missing (living people)
France international women's rugby sevens players